Nelson Williams may refer to:

Nelson Williams (politician) (1825–1899), American politician
Nelson Williams (trumpeter) (1917–1973), American trumpeter
Nelson G. Williams (1823–1897), American army officer